is a chokehold in judo. It is one of the twelve constriction techniques of Kodokan Judo in the Shime-waza list.  Do-jime is one of the four forbidden techniques, Kinshi-waza. Do-jime is also a prohibited technique in Judo competitions, and is considered a 'slight infringement' according to IJF rules, Section 27: Prohibited acts and penalties, article 21.

See also
 The Canon Of Judo
 Compressive asphyxia

References

External links
 judoinfosite.nl Do-jime information.

Judo technique
Grappling
Grappling hold
Grappling positions
Martial art techniques